Conus empressae is a species of sea snails, a marine gastropod mollusc in the family Conidae, the cone snails and their allies.

Like all species within the genus Conus, these snails are predatory and venomous. They are capable of "stinging" humans, therefore live ones should be handled carefully or not at all.

Description
The size of the shell attains 25 mm.

Distribution
This marine species occurs off the Philippines and Australia.

References

  Lorenz, F. 2001. Notes on some species of Conidae and Cypraeidae from Indonesia with the description of Conus empressae sp. nov. (Mollusca: Gastropoda). Schriften zur Malakozoologie aus dem Haus der Natur-Cismar 18:15–20, pl. 2.
 Filmer R.M. (2010) A taxonomic review of the Conus boeticus Reeve complex (Gastropoda – Conidae). Visaya 2(6): 21–80 page(s): 45 
 Puillandre N., Duda T.F., Meyer C., Olivera B.M. & Bouchet P. (2015). One, four or 100 genera? A new classification of the cone snails. Journal of Molluscan Studies. 81: 1–23

External links
 The Conus Biodiversity website
 

empressae
Gastropods described in 2001